List of basketball clubs in Turkey sorted by division:

Men's

TBL

TB2L 

 
Turkey sport-related lists
Clubs in Turkey